Samandıra Army Air Base,  is a military airport of the Turkish Army located in Kartal district of Istanbul, Turkey. The air base is home to 4th Army Aviation Regiment of the Turkish First Army.

The facility is situated within the Gen. İsmail Hakkı Tunaboylu Barracks just north of the Anatolian Motorway . Two helicopter squadrons are stationed at the army air base, each operating ten UH-1H Iroquois and ten UH-60A Black Hawk. In addition, eight UH-1H and three  Cessna T182TSkylane are available for use to the HQ of the regiment.

Other airports in Istanbul
 Atatürk Airport
 Istanbul Sabiha Gökçen International Airport
 Hezarfen Airfield
 Istanbul Airport

References

Samandıra
Heliports in Turkey
Samandira Air Base
Turkish Army air bases
Sancaktepe